Joe Marchant (11 September 1884, date of death unknown) was an Australian rules footballer who played with St Kilda in the Victorian Football League (VFL).

Notes

External links 

Year of death missing
Australian rules footballers from Victoria (Australia)
St Kilda Football Club players
1884 births